Duane is both a given name for a male, and a family name. The name derives from St. Dubhán, who established an abbey in Hook Head, Ireland, during the 5th century. As a surname it is O'Dubhain, or Dubhan. Dubhain was a popular given name in 16th century southern Ireland; its anglicized form is Duane. 

In the United States, Duane became a popular name around the 1920s and remained one of the 200 most popular names for about 50 years.  The spelling Dwayne was adopted as time went on, most likely because of the also popular name Wayne.  Dwayne eventually became the preferred spelling, especially in the southern U.S., while Duane remains the more common spelling in northern-Midwest states such as Minnesota, Michigan, and North Dakota. Dwyane was once a birth certificate spelling mistake that gained popularity in the 2000s and 2010s thanks to basketball legend Dwyane Wade.

Notable people named Duane
 Duane Allen (born 1943), lead singer of The Oak Ridge Boys country and gospel quartet
 Duane Allen (American football) (1937–2003), American football player
 Duane Allman (1946–1971), American guitarist
 Duane Bastress (born 1983), American mixed martial artist
 Duane Beeson (1921–1947), American World War II fighter pilot
 Duane Bickett (born 1962), American football player
 Duane Bobick (born 1950), American boxer
 Duane Brown (born 1985), American football player
 Duane Bryers (1911–2012), American painter, illustrator and sculptor
 Duane R. Bushey (born 1944), seventh Master Chief Petty Officer of the United States Navy
 Duane Butler (born 1973), American football linebacker
 Duane G. Carey (born 1957), American astronaut
 Duane Carter (1913–1993), American racecar driver
 Duane Pancho Carter, Jr. (born 1950), American racecar driver, son of Duane Carter
 Duane Chapman (born 1953), American bounty hunter and star of the reality TV series Dog the Bounty Hunter
 Duane Clarridge (born 1932), American CIA supervisor known for his role in the Iran-Contra Affair
 Duane Clemons (born 1974), American football player
 Duane Courtney (born 1985), English footballer
 Duane Denison, American guitarist
 Duane E. Dewey (born 1931), United States Marine
 Duane Eddy (born 1938), American guitarist
 Duane Elgin (born 1943), American author and media activist
 Duane Ferrell (born 1965), American basketball player
 Duane Gill (born 1959), American professional wrestler
 Duane Gish (born 1921), American biochemist
 Duane Glinton (born 1982), Turks & Caicos Islands footballer
 Duane Graveline (born 1931), American astronaut
 Duane D. Hackney (1947−1993), United States Air Force Pararescueman
 Duane Hanson (1925–1996), American artist and sculptor
 Duane Harden (born 1971), American singer and songwriter
 Duane Henry (born 1985), English actor
 Duane Holmes (born 1994), American-English footballer
 Duane Hudson (1910–1995), British Special Operations Executive (SOE) officer during WWII
 Duane Jones (1936–1988), American actor
 Duane Josephson (1942–1997), American baseball player
 Duane Kuiper (born 1950), American baseball sportscaster and former player
 Duane Litfin (born 1944), seventh president of Wheaton College in Wheaton, Illinois
 Duane Ludwig (born 1978), American mixed martial artist
 Duane Martin (born 1965), American film and television actor
 Duane Michals (born 1932), American photographer
 Duane Bill Parcells (born 1941), American National Football League head coach
 Duane D. Pearsall (1922–2010), American entrepreneur known for smoke detectors
 Duane Pederson (born 1938), American Eastern Orthodox minister
 Duane Peters (born 1961), American punk rock singer/songwriter and professional skateboarder
 Duane Pillette (1922–2011), American baseball player
 Duane Pomeroy (born 1952), American politician and teacher
 Duane Sand (born 1965), American politician
 Duane Simolke (born 1965), American writer
 Duane Starks (born 1974), American football cornerback
 Duane Sutter (born 1960), Canadian National Hockey League player and head coach
 Duane Thomas (born 1947), American football player
 Duane Thomas (boxer) (1961–2000), American boxer
 Duane Washington (born 1964), American basketball player
 Duane Whitaker (born 1959), American actor
 Duane Wilson (born 1934), American baseball player

See also
 Duane (surname)
 Dwayne, including variants such as Dwane and DeWayne

References 

English-language masculine given names
English masculine given names